The number of Chinese residents in Uganda has rapidly expanded in the 2000s along with the rise of trade ties.

Trade
The rapid expansions in trade relations begins in 2005 when Chinese investments in Uganda only included a hotel and restaurant.  By 2010, China's investments shot up so much that it ranked second to the United Kingdom.

The biggest Chinese employer in Uganda is Zhang Hao, a native of Shenyang, who arrived in 1999 and started an import business that grew to an enterprise encompassing a restaurant, bakery, firm selling flat-screen televisions and security company.

However the increased trade and number of residents has caused a backlash. The influx of shopkeepers from China has caused consternation among Ugandans who compete in retail. In July 2011, Ugandan shopkeepers in Kampala ordered a work stoppage to protest against rising prices, an unstable exchange rate, and a flood of competition by Chinese and Indian traders. The organizers of the strike, the Kampala City Traders Association, named "aliens doing petty trade, especially the Chinese" as a source of concern.

Other areas of trade include construction of buildings, fiber optics, and a road. Projects being built by the Chinese government include "a hospital in Kampala, an agricultural demonstration center, and a government office block building."

Integration and community
Chinese investors founded the China Enterprises Chamber of Commerce in Uganda in March 2009, a trade organization composed of over 30 firms.

References

Asian diaspora in Uganda
Uganda